Morgaine  may refer to:

 Morgaine, alternative name for Morgan le Fay in original legends and some modern adaptations such as The Mists of Avalon
 Morgaine, heroine of The Morgaine Stories by C. J. Cherryh
 Morgaine le Fey (DC Comics), a character inspired by the legendary figure
 Morgaine, a sorceress in the Doctor Who serial Battlefield

See also
Morgan (disambiguation)
Morgana (disambiguation)
Morgane (disambiguation)
Morgan le Fay (disambiguation)